The Opel Karl (also known as the Vauxhall Viva and Vinfast Fadil) is a city car with a hatchback manufactured by GM Korea and marketed by Opel as a rebadged and restyled variant of the fourth-generation Chevrolet Spark, replacing the Suzuki-sourced Agila in Opel's range. Named after Adam Opel's eldest son Carl, the city car was discontinued following the sale of Opel to PSA Group in 2019, the same year production in Vietnam started under license of a rebadged variant, the VinFast Fadil. General Motors marketed a rebadged variant in the United Kingdom as the Vauxhall Viva.

Overview 
The Karl is a rebadged and restyled variant of the fourth-generation Chevrolet Spark, manufactured in South Korea. With fuel consumption reaching , the Karl's  three-cylinder direct injection engine making  is from the GM engine family. Dimensionally very similar to its predecessor, it is  lower, making it almost the same size as the more expensive three-door Opel Adam.

Equipment includes six airbags, ESC with hill start assist, Tyre Pressure Monitoring System (TPMS), electric power steering, cruise control, rear parking sensors, lane departure warning, automatic climate control, start-stop system, a seven-inch display with IntelliLink and OnStar systems, and optional - heated front seats, heated steering wheel, electric sunroof and 16-inch alloy wheels.

The Opel Karl was not sold in all European markets. It was not regularly available in Norway, Sweden, CIS countries, Malta, Eastern Balkans (including Bulgaria and Romania), Greece, Turkey, nor Cyprus.

The Karl had its second world premiere held in Rijeka, Croatia in 2015. In October 2018, it was announced that the production of the Karl and Viva would be discontinued by the end of 2019.

Vauxhall Viva 
The Viva range includes the base SE model, the SE A/C (which has air conditioning as standard, hence the name) and the top SL.

The range has a high level standard specification compared to similar vehicles from other manufacturers, including a lane departure warning system, cruise control, speed limiter, trip computer (instant MPG, average MPG, average speed, stopwatch and trip computer), tyre pressure monitoring system, electronic stability program and traction control, front fog lamps and cornering lamps.

The SL offers digital climate control, partial leather trim and alloy wheels. Options include an electronically operated glass sunroof, a touch screen entertainment system (replacing the 300/300BT stereo unit) and a "Winter Pack" comprising heated seats, steering wheel, and door mirrors.

VinFast Fadil 
The Vietnamese car company VinFast licensed the Opel Karl from General Motors for their city car, the VinFast Fadil. As a rebadged variant of the Chevrolet Spark and Opel Karl, the grille is revised. It was released in September 2019. Early vehicles were manufactured in South Korea, but in 2019, production was started in VinFast manufacturing plant in Haiphong.

In January 2022, VinFast announced it will stop producing vehicles with internal combustion engines (ICE) which included the Fadil by the end of 2022 to focus on research and development efforts on battery electric vehicles.

Safety

Sales

References

External links 

 
 Fadil | Ô Tô - VinFast

Karl
Viva
Cars introduced in 2015
City cars
Front-wheel-drive vehicles
Hatchbacks
2010s cars
ASEAN NCAP superminis